These are the results of the men's team all-around competition, one of eight events for male competitors in artistic gymnastics at the 2000 Summer Olympics in Sydney. The qualification and final rounds took place on September 16 and 18 at the Sydney SuperDome.

Results

Qualification

Twelve national teams composed by six gymnasts competed in the team all-around event in the artistic gymnastics qualification round on September 16.
The six highest scoring teams advanced to the final on September 18.

Final

References
Official Olympic Report
www.gymnasticsresults.com

Men's artistic team all-around
2000
Olympics
Men's events at the 2000 Summer Olympics